Oswald Christian Orwoll (November 17, 1900 – May 8, 1967) was an American professional baseball and professional football player. He was born in Portland, Oregon, and attended Luther College of Decorah, Iowa.

Orwoll's ten-year pro baseball career began in the high minors in 1926. Orwoll finished with a career record of 6–7 in 39 games pitched (eight starts) and a .294 batting average with 65 hits (15 doubles and three triples) and 28 RBIs in 94 total MLB games. In the field, Orwoll started 33 MLB games at first base and seven as an outfielder.

He was a member of Connie Mack's 1929 World Series championship team—one of the strongest clubs in MLB history—but did not appear in any games during the Series, played against the Chicago Cubs and won by Philadelphia in five games. On November 29, 1930, the Athletics traded him, with Homer Summa, to the Portland Beavers of the Pacific Coast League for Herb Lahti. Orwoll never returned to the majors, retiring from baseball in 1935.

Orwoll also played halfback for the Milwaukee Badgers of the National Football League (NFL) in 1926.

References

External links

1900 births
1967 deaths
American football halfbacks
Baseball players from Portland, Oregon
Des Moines Demons players
Luther Norse baseball players
Major League Baseball first basemen
Major League Baseball pitchers
Milwaukee Badgers players
Milwaukee Brewers (minor league) players
Philadelphia Athletics players
Players of American football from Portland, Oregon
Portland Beavers players
St. Paul Saints (AA) players